The black sharkminnow (Labeo chrysophekadion), also known as the black shark or black labeo, is a species of freshwater fish in the carp family. It is found in the Mekong and Chao Phraya river basins, Malay Peninsula, Sumatra, Java and Borneo. It is sometimes seen in the aquarium trade, but is generally unsuitable for home aquaria due to its large adult size and territorial, aggressive behavior.

Range in Thailand 
Chao Phraya River, Mekong River, Mae Klong River, Salween River, Thai Peninsular and the south east.

References 

Labeo
Fish of Southeast Asia
Fish described in 1850